Former names:  Apostolic Vicariate of Alabama and the Floridas (1825-1829), Diocese of Mobile (1829-1954; 1969-1980), Diocese of Mobile-Birmingham (1954-1969).

The Archdiocese of Mobile (Latin: Archidiœcesis Mobiliensis) is a Latin Church ecclesiastical territory or archdiocese of the Catholic Church comprising the lower half of the state of Alabama. It is the metropolitan see of the Province of Mobile, which includes the suffragan bishopric sees of the Diocese of Biloxi, the Diocese of Jackson, and the Diocese of Birmingham in Alabama.  It was established as the Archdiocese of Mobile on November 16, 1980. The Archbishop of Mobile is the pastor of the Cathedral Basilica of the Immaculate Conception located in Mobile, Alabama.

The Archdiocese encompasses 22,969 square miles and comprises the lower 28 counties of the state of Alabama, namely: Autauga, Baldwin, Barbour, Bullock, Butler, Choctaw, Clarke, Coffee, Conecuh, Covington, Crenshaw, Dale, Dallas, Elmore, Escambia, Geneva, Henry, Houston, Lee, Lowndes, Macon, Mobile, Monroe, Montgomery, Pike, Russell, Washington and Wilcox, with 76 parishes and 7 missions and a total Catholic population of approximately 108,000 Catholics, or roughly 5% of the total population of 1.84 million.

History 

The diocese was originally erected by Pope Leo XII in 1825, as Vicariate Apostolic of Alabama and the Floridas. It was established as the Diocese of Mobile by Pope Pius VIII on May 15, 1829.  The diocese had its name changed to the Diocese of Mobile-Birmingham by Pope Pius XII on July 9, 1954, and was redesignated as the Diocese of Mobile by Pope Paul VI on June 28, 1969.  The Ecclesiastical Province of Mobile was erected by Pope John Paul II on November 16, 1980. Before then, the diocese had been part of the Ecclesiastical Province of New Orleans.

Reports of sexual abuse:

In December 2018, Archbishop Thomas Rodi released the names of 29 priests and religious order clergy who were accused of committing acts of sex abuse while serving in the Archdiocese of Mobile. Claims of sex abuse dated as early as 1950. At least 2 Catholic clergy on this list were convicted, with one other being sued. Archbishop Rodi also issued an apology and asked for forgiveness.

Bishops 
The lists of the bishops and archbishops of Mobile and dates of service, followed by other affiliated bishops:

Bishops of Mobile
 Michael Portier (1825–1859)
 John Quinlan (1859–1883)
 Dominic Manucy (1884)
 Jeremiah O'Sullivan (1885–1896)
 Edward Patrick Allen (1897–1926)
 Thomas Joseph Toolen (1927–1954), title changed with title of diocese; also elevated to Archbishop ad personam in 1954

Bishop of Mobile-Birmingham
 Thomas Joseph Toolen (1954–1969), archbishop ad personam

Bishop of Mobile
 John Lawrence May (1969–1980), appointed Archbishop of Saint Louis

Archbishops of Mobile
 Oscar Hugh Lipscomb (1980–2008)
 Thomas John Rodi (2008–present)

Former Auxiliary Bishops
 Joseph Aloysius Durick (1954–1964), appointed Coadjutor Bishop of Nashville and subsequently succeeded to that see
 Joseph Gregory Vath (1966-1969), appointed Bishop of Birmingham in Alabama 1969-1987

Other priests of this diocese who became bishops
 John Stephen (Jean Étienne) Bazin, appointed Bishop of Vincennes in 1847
 Anthony Dominic Ambrose Pellicer, appointed Bishop of San Antonio in 1874
 John William Shaw, appointed Coadjutor Bishop of San Antonio in 1910
 William Benedict Friend, appointed Auxiliary Bishop of Alexandria-Shreveport in 1979
 William Russell Houck, appointed Auxiliary Bishop of Jackson in 1979

Schools

High Schools and Middle Schools

High Schools 
 McGill-Toolen Catholic High School (Mobile)
 Montgomery Catholic Preparatory School (Montgomery)
 St. Michael Catholic High School (Fairhope)

Middle Schools 
 * Montgomery Catholic Preparatory School (Montgomery)

Elementary Schools 
 Christ the King Catholic School (Daphne)
 Corpus Christi School (Mobile)
 Little Flower Catholic School (Mobile)
 Montgomery Catholic Preparatory St. Bede Campus (Montgomery)
 Montgomery Catholic Preparatory Holy Spirit Campus (Montgomery)
 St. Benedict Catholic School (Elberta)
 St. Dominic School (Mobile)
 St. Ignatius School (Mobile)
 St. John Catholic Montessori School (Enterprise)
 St. Mary Catholic School (Mobile)
 St. Michael the Archangel School (Auburn)
 St. Patrick School (Robertsdale)
 St. Pius X Catholic School (Mobile)
 St. Vincent de Paul Day Care  (Mobile)

Private Schools - (Independent schools within the territory but not under the administration of the Archdiocese of Mobile.) 

 Resurrection Catholic School (Montgomery)
 St. Joseph Child Development Center (Fort Mitchell)

See also

 Catholic Church by country
 Catholic Church hierarchy
 Convent and Academy of the Visitation
 List of the Catholic dioceses of the United States

References

External links 
 Roman Catholic Archdiocese of Mobile Official Site
 1911 History of the Archdiocese of Mobile
Archdiocese of Mobile article, Encyclopedia of Alabama
 History of the Archdiocese of Mobile

 
Religious organizations established in 1825
1825 establishments in Alabama
Mobile
Mobile